The Ivanhoe line was the local passenger service operated on the Midland Main Line between  and  between 1993, when three intermediate stations were re-opened, and June 2005, when the separate Leicester–Loughborough service was withdrawn. Intermediate stations on the route are now served by East Midlands Railway's hourly service between Leicester, Nottingham and Lincoln.

History
In 2006 the Conservative Party released a brief of its plans for reopening the line.

A report published in December 2008 assumed that the total number of passenger journeys would be 150,000 per annum, each paying an average of £3.15 per journey.

ATOC estimated that the capital cost at £49 million, the benefit-cost ratio (BCR) to be 1.3 and the BCR excluding capital costs to be 2.9. Leicestershire County Council again ruled out the proposal, claiming it would cost a £4 million annual subsidy. However, previous reports had suggested the subsidy required would be far less, and that after the initial investment the line would make money.

2008
One station on the Derby–Birmingham main line, Willington, past the western (Burton) end of the route, was constructed in the mid 1990s with Ivanhoe branding and painted in the according blue livery. However, as a result of the failure of the Burton upon Trent–Leicester development to go ahead, it is a curious anomaly, separated from the Ivanhoe line scheme.

A similar anomaly lies at the eastern (Leicester) end of the line, along the Leicester-Loughborough main line, where three stations were reopened as a planned first phase of full reopening:

Syston
Sileby
Barrow-upon-Soar

Local passenger services on the route are currently operated by diesel multiple units of Classes 153, 156 or 158.

Trains use the slow lines from just north of Leicester to Loughborough, previously used almost exclusively for freight, so as well as the rebuilding of the three intermediate stations, work was also required to build a new third platform at Loughborough facing the Down Slow, and also a new crossover and signal south of Loughborough so southbound trains could cross from the Down Slow to the Up Slow.
 
Barrow and Sileby each have two platforms (with limited access for disabled passengers), but Syston has a single platform serving both directions. Syston station will be rebuilt around 2013 during a Leicester area re-signalling scheme as part of Network Rails Route Utilisation Strategy for freight.

Future
The intermediate stations are capable of taking only a two-coach train, which has led to overcrowding on some services, especially now that the service is extended to Nottingham and Lincoln. The latest Route Utilisation Strategy for the East Midlands makes recommendations for platform lengthening.

East Midlands Parkway railway station has now been built on the route. The Borough of Charnwood's local plan of 2004 anticipates a station at Thurmaston.

In 2022 the closed section of the line was one of nine schemes chosen to undergo a feasibility scrutiny by Network Rail as part of the government's Restoring Your Railway programme. If approved, work could start in 2024 and the line reopened in 2026.

References

Rail transport in Leicestershire
Railway lines in the East Midlands
Standard gauge railways in England